

References

Bibliography 
 Reece  JB, Urry LA, Cain ML, Wasserman SA, Minorsky PV, Jackson RB. Campbell Biology (10th ed.). Addison Wesley Longman; 2014. 

Lists of diseases
Disability-related lists
Biological nomenclature
Medical terminology
Lists of biology lists